In United States law, state preemption is the invalidation of some action by, or the wresting of power from, a portion of the state government (more often than not a municipality or other part of the state government that only exercises power within a certain geographical area such as a county) usually by the state legislature. Preemption is often used when there is a political disagreement between the state legislature and municipal governments. The largest division between the legislature and the government is typically partisan; most state legislatures have been, since 2010, dominated by Republicans, while city governments are typically dominated by Democrats.

Types of preemption
State preemption comes in many forms. A state that enacts a requirement but allows municipality to pass more stringent laws is engaging in preemption; however, most controversial forms of state preemption are the opposite.

Some preemption laws contain punishments for enforcing preempted laws; these punishments include the withholding of state funds from the municipality or making officials open to lawsuits. In 2016, Arizona enacted SB 1487 (Rev. Stat. 41-194.01), which both withholds state funds and requires a large bond to challenge preempting statutes. SB 1487 was challenged by the city of Tucson; the state supreme court stated that the bond requirement would stop municipalities from challenging statutes, but refused to overturn that provision.

Legal basis
In many states, municipalities only have powers specifically granted to them by state legislatures. Most states have some form of home rule, which expands municipal power; despite this, only California and Ohio protect municipalities from preemption. This protection is shrinking, since Ohio preempted cities from raising the minimum wage and charging a fee on single-use plastic bags. The Supreme Court of the United States has struck down preemption laws that had a civil rights concern, such as in Romer v. Evans (1995).

Examples

Firearms
Most states have some preemption against local firearm regulations; in 2019, this number was 43.

In 2017, Tallahassee city officials (including Mayor Andrew Gillum) were sued under Florida's punitive preemption laws; officials were not allowed to use city funds for their defense, instead having to be defended pro bono. A state appellate court ruled that, as the law was not actively enforced, it did not violate the statute.

LGBT anti-discrimination ordinances
In 1992, Colorado voters approved Amendment 2, which preempted municipal anti-discrimination laws protecting gay people. Over the next few years, similar laws were voted down in several states. The Colorado amendment was invalidated by the SCOTUS in Romer v. Evans (1995), with the majority opinion stating that the law was "born of animosity toward the class of persons affected." In the 2010s, three state legislatures passed laws preempting municipal anti-discrimination laws protecting trans people; one such law, North Carolina's HB2, was repealed following national opposition.

See also
Federal preemption
Paramountcy (Canada)

References

Further reading

 
 
 
 
 

State law in the United States